| tries = {{#expr:
 + 4 + 1 + 5 + 1 + 4 + 2 + 5 + 4 + 5 + 4
 + 2 + 4 + 4 + 4 + 5 + 5 + 1 + 3 + 4 + 4
 + 7 + 5 + 5 + 6 + 4 + 6 + 2 + 5 + 1 + 4
 + 5 + 3 + 3 + 1 + 1 + 5 + 5 + 3 + 2 + 4
 + 6 + 3 + 4 + 7 + 3 + 9 + 6 + 6 + 3 + 3
 + 4 + 6 + 5 + 3 + 4 + 4 + 4 + 1 + 2 +11
 + 3 + 2 + 3 + 5 + 5 + 5 + 5 + 6 + 3 + 5
 + 2 + 5 + 1 + 5 + 4 + 3 + 5 + 4 + 8 + 3
 + 7 + 1 + 7 + 4 + 8 + 2 + 3 + 8 + 6 + 8
 + 6 + 3 + 7 + 4 + 4 + 3 + 7 + 4 + 2 + 8
 + 2 +11 + 5 + 9 + 4 + 6 + 5 + 3 + 7 + 6
}}
| top point scorer = Felipe Contepomi (Leinster)(287 points)
| top try scorer = Tommy Bowe (Ulster)Jason Forster (Newport Gwent Dragons)(10 tries)
| website = www.rabodirectpro12.com
| prevseason = 2004–05
| nextseason = 2006–07
}}
The 2005–06 Celtic League was the fifth Celtic League season, and the third following the introduction of regional rugby in Wales.  Eleven teams, from three countries participated. The final table was dominated by the Irish, with the top three spots taken by Ulster, Leinster and Munster respectively. The 2005–06 season was the first (and last) season for which the "free weekend" was awarded points for. Due to the odd number of teams participating, for every round of fixtures, one team has a so-called "free weekend". Each time this occurred, the team was awarded four points, so although at the end of the season it did not alter the positions (each team has a guaranteed 8 points), the table is skewed during the season according to the fixtures.

Teams

Table

Results

Round 1

Round 2

Welsh Round 1
 All-Welsh Round 5 matches played mid-week to allow Welsh teams to play in the Anglo-Welsh Cup.

Round 3

Round 4

Round 5

Round 6

Round 7

Round 8

Round 9

Welsh Round 2
 All-Welsh Round 9 matches postponed to allow Welsh teams to play in the Anglo-Welsh Cup.

Round 10

Round 11

Round 12

Round 13

Round 14

Round 15

Round 16

Round 10 rescheduled match

Round 17

Round 18

Welsh Round 3
 All-Welsh Round 6 matches played mid-week to allow Welsh teams to play in the Anglo-Welsh Cup.

Round 15 rescheduled match
 This match was postponed from the weekend of 4 March to allow Llanelli Scarlets to play in the Anglo-Welsh Cup semi-final.

Round 19

Round 20

Round 16 rescheduled match

Round 21

Round 17 rescheduled match
 This match was postponed from the weekend of 9 April to allow Llanelli Scarlets to play in the Anglo-Welsh Cup Final.

Round 22

Leading scorers
Note: Flags to the left of player names indicate national team as has been defined under IRB eligibility rules, or primary nationality for players who have not yet earned international senior caps. Players may hold one or more non-IRB nationalities.

Top points scorers

Top try scorers

Notes

External links
 MagnersLeague.com
 2005–06 Celtic League at BBC

References

 
2005-06
2005–06 in European rugby union leagues
2005–06 in Irish rugby union
2005–06 in Welsh rugby union
2005–06 in Scottish rugby union